Guligas is a breed of domestic fat-tailed sheep from Uzbekistan, a variety of the Karakul sheep. It is a pink roan color, sometimes described as lilac or grey-brown.

References

External links
 

Sheep breeds originating in Uzbekistan